Kichenok is a Ukrainian surname. Notable people with the surname include:

Lyudmyla Kichenok (born 1992), Ukrainian tennis player
Nadiia Kichenok (born 1992), Ukrainian tennis player

Ukrainian-language surnames